Goundo Diallo (born 19 May 1997) is a Malian basketball player for Sainte Savine Basket and the Malian national team.

She represented Mali at the 2019 Women's Afrobasket.

References

1997 births
Living people
Forwards (basketball)
Malian expatriate basketball people in France
Malian women's basketball players
21st-century Malian people